Computer Warrior (initially titled Ultimate Warrior) was a comic strip series that debuted in Eagle on 13 April 1985 (shortly after the comic merged with Tiger) and ran for another nine years. The plot involves people playing real-life versions of computer games.

Plot
In 1985, following the success of the film Tron and the incorporation of the Tiger, the Eagle launched a new strip called "The Ultimate Warrior". This was quickly renamed "The Computer Warrior" and was one of only two strips (the other being Dan Dare) to last for the rest of the comics lifetime.

When the strip first appeared, Bobby Patterson's friend Martin French mysteriously disappears.  Bobby Patterson receives a message in which Martin reveals that he had discovered a code to activate a real life facility on his computer, enabling him to literally enter the computer games realm and that his disappearance means that he has lost a game and is now trapped within the Nightmare Zone.

In order to rescue Martin, Bobby must practice on the games before using the code to play the games in the computer realm. A single loss would mean Bobby himself would also be trapped in the Nightmare Zone. The only way for Bobby to free Martin was to complete 10 games himself using the code. Bobby made great progress through the tests, including overcoming various real life problems with his mother and father. Once Martin himself had the chance to free himself by finding a secret tunnel in the Nightmare Zone where he met the computer who gave him one chance to escape, by completing without practice the game UggaBulla, but unfortunately Martin was not successful. Eventually Bobby, saw through all 10 games, many of them used by the Eagle comic itself as prize giveaways and promotions throughout the run. Martin was rescued and Bobby gained the title of Computer Warrior.

Due to the strip's popularity and a desire to continue it beyond the original concept it was then revealed that the purpose of the challenge was to find a champion to defeat the dark forces of the Nightmare Zone.  The realm's ruler, the Computer Warlord, gathered together all qualified Computer Warriors and eliminated them one by one (banishing them to the Nightmare Zone) in a series of tests to find the 'Ultimate Warrior'.

As before, each test was the successful completion of a popular computer game of the time. Bobby made friends and enemies amongst the other Computer Warriors as the tests went on, but eventually Bobby emerged triumphant and became the Computer Warlord's champion; the other Computer Warriors being freed from the Nightmare Zone.

The Computer Warlord then set Bobby 5 more tests to defeat the Nightmare Zone creatures once and for all. In the final test the Nightmare Zone creatures picked a champion to defeat Bobby, his evil self! Finally, Bobby defeated this last enemy and the Nightmare Zone creatures were trapped in a 'cube of holding' by the Warlord.

In future stories, Bobby defeated various Nightmare Zone creatures who refused to enter the cube and then became the Computer Warlord, the old one having died and bequeathing it to Bobby. Bobby then invited Eagle readers to take part in their own 'real life' games, with no danger of going to the Nightmare Zone!

Eagle then had another revamp and a new plot line was introduced. Bobby was summoned before the 'Council of Warlords' to be told he wasn't really a Computer Warlord, and demoted to just plain Computer Warrior. Then another Warlord named Baal explained that they too were being attacked by Nightmare Zone creatures and he needed a champion to defeat them. By this stage, the quality of the writing had dropped significantly and the strip was reduced to Bobby being set test after test after test to 'prove he was a champion' which lasted for the rest of the strip's duration. No effort was made to introduce any other plot except the eternal completion of video games.

The Eagle became a monthly comic in the early nineties and the Computer Warrior and Dan Dare became the only strips that weren't reprints. The Eagle eventually ceased production in January 1994 and the Computer Warrior storyline was quickly wrapped up. In the final video game test, Bobby played "Another World". When he successfully completed this, he was told by Baal that "no test had been too great" and he had now defeated the Nightmare Zone forces. How he achieved this was never explained. Bobby was returned to his home and told that all his adventures had taken place in seconds in the real world and he would no longer be needed. Bobby pleaded with Baal to come back but had to contend with himself that he would miss being the Computer Warrior.

For the first three years the writer was credited as "D. Spence" a pen-name used by Alan Grant.

Games featured in the story 
While the comic featured both fictional and real games, the majority of the titles were games published in the UK by U.S. Gold for 8 and 16 bit computers.

Zyklon Attack (fictional)
Wizard of Wor (1983)
Pastfinder (1984)
Rescue on Fractalus! (1985)
The Great American Cross-Country Road Race (1985)
Ghostbusters (1984)
Walls of Jericho (fictional)
Desert Fox (1985)
Psi 5 Trading Company (1986)
Uggabulla (fictional)
Silent Service (1985)
Kung Fu Master (1985)
Infiltrator (1986)
Gauntlet (1986)
Express Raider (1987)
World Games (1986)
Ace of Aces (1986)
Metro Cross (1988)
Impossible Mission II (1988)
Side Arms Hyper Dyne (1988)
Black Christmas (fictional)
Wizard Warz (1987)
Battlefield 3000 (fictional)
4th & Inches (1987)
Dream Warrior (1988)
Blood of Dracula (fictional)
Bionic Commando (1988)
RoadBlasters (1988)
ThunderBlade (1988)
The Deep (1988)
Zak McKracken and the Alien Mindbenders (1988)
Forgotten Worlds (1988)
Indiana Jones and the Last Crusade: The Action Game (1989)
Slay Ride (fictional)
Turbo Outrun (1989)
Black Tiger (1989)
Crackdown (1990)
Dynasty Wars (1990)
U.N. Squadron (1990)
Time Warrior (fictional)
ESWAT (1990)
Space Attack (fictional)
Mercs (1991)
Army War (fictional)
Street Fighter 2 (1992)
Another World (1993)

References 
International Heroes entry
List of games featured in the series

Eagle (comic) characters
Eagle comic strips